John Joseph Aquilina  (born 12 March 1950, in Malta), a former Australian politician, is a former member of the New South Wales Legislative Assembly representing the electorate of Blacktown between 1981 and 1991 and the electorate of Riverstone between 1991 and 2011 for the Labor Party.

Between 1986 and 1988 and again between 1995 and 2003, he served in a range of ministerial portfolios including Minister for Natural Resources and Minister for Youth and Community Services in the Wran and Unsworth Labor governments and Minister for Education and Training, Minister for Fair Trading, and Minister for Land and Water Conservation in the Carr Labor government.

From 2003 to 2007, he was Speaker of the NSW Legislative Assembly, and was Leader of the House from 2007 until his retirement in 2011.

From November 2013 till December 2015, he was engaged as Malta's High Commissioner to India, Bangladesh and as Ambassador to Nepal.

From December 2015 to date, he has been engaged as Malta's Ambassador to China.

Early years and background
In 1956, aged 6 years, Aquilina migrated from Malta to Australia with his parents and younger brother. Studying at the University of Sydney, Aquilina completed a Bachelor of Arts and a Diploma of Education in 1971 and was a member of the University of Sydney Regiment between 1968 and 1970, although did not see active duty. He commenced teaching at Oaklands Central School as a high school teacher, before returning to Sydney. Whilst at university in 1970, Aquilina joined the Blacktown Branch of the Australian Labor Party. In 1974, he became an Australian citizen.

In 1977, he was elected as an alderman to Blacktown City Council representing the Labor Party up until 1983; and went on to become Mayor of the Council between 1977 and 1981. In 1979, he was appointed a member of the Ethnic Affairs Commission of New South Wales (now the Community Relations Commission of New South Wales) and at various times has held positions with the State Records Authority (2003–2006); Sydney Grammar School Board of Trustees; appointed a Fellow of the Senate of the University of Sydney; an Honorary Associate of the University of Sydney Graduate School of Government; a member of the Advisory Board of the Sydney Conservatorium of Music; a Life Member of the Royal Institute for Deaf and Blind Children and a member of Blacktown City Lions Club.

Aquilina married Anne Michelle Sutcliffe in 1977, and together they had two sons and one daughter. Following the death of Anne Sutcliffe in 2003, he remarried Ann Elizabeth Moran in 2006.

New South Wales political career
Elected as Member for Blacktown in 1981, Aquilina held a number of junior portfolios including Chair of various committees before being appointed Minister for Natural Resources in the Wran government in 1986. In that same year, following the retirement of Wran and Unsworth becoming Premier, Aquilina was appointed Minister for Youth and Community Services and Assistant Minister for Ethnic Affairs. He held these portfolios up until the 1988 state election when Labor lost government to the Greiner-Murray Liberal-National coalition.

In opposition, Aquilina held the shadow portfolios of Education and Training, Youth and Ethnic Affairs.

In 1990, following an electoral redistribution, a new electorate of Mount Druitt was created. Richard Amery moved to contest this new safe Labor seat. Aquilina decided to contest Amery's old seat of Riverstone; and Pam Allan contest Aquilina's old seat of Blacktown. Aquilina was successful at the 1991 state election and has subsequently defended the seat at the 1995, 1999, 2003 and 2007 elections.

Following the election of the Carr Labor government in 1995, Aquilina was appointed Minister for Education and Training (a position he held for over six years) and also Minister Assisting the Premier on Youth Affairs (over four years). In 2001, he was appointed Minister for Land and Water Conservation and Minister for Fair Trading. Aquilina held both these position until the retirement of John Murray, when he assumed the position of Speaker of the New South Wales Legislative Assembly in 2003.

After the 2007 state election, there was considerable political pressure for the appointment of an independent Speaker. Aquilina stood aside in favour of independent Member for Northern Tablelands Richard Torbay.

In 2007, he became Leader of the House. On 25 October 2010, Aquilina announced that he would not be contesting the next state election.

Controversy
In the 1982 John Aquilina wrote in the Daily Mirror that it was his electorate's and his personal view that homosexuality should not be decriminalised in New South Wales and he would vote against it in any case. Gay rights activists Garry Wotherspoon and Fabian LoSchiavo confronted him with a petition with 132 against his stance which was shown on ABC's Four Corners program. He has voted against any legislation in favour of homosexual rights since.

In March 2010, it was reported that Aquilina's 25–year old son, Jeremy, was charged with five counts of sexual assault and one count of indecency on a 22–year old woman in a park in St Clair in western Sydney.

On 10 April 2001 John Aquilina raised the issue in parliament of a foiled plot by a high school student to replicate the Columbine High School Massacre. He alleged that the student's diary contained plans to kill fellow students and teachers. His staff embellished the story, telling reporters the student had access to a gun. On this, the Police Commissioner contradicted Aquilina's version of events, and the boy's family subsequently threatened the sue the Government.

Aquilina was later the subject of an Independent Commission Against Corruption (ICAC) investigation that explored possible false statements to the media and political interference in police procedures. The investigation concluded in August 2001 and found no evidence of corrupt conduct. However, Aquilina relinquished the Education and Training portfolio in late 2001 and was shifted to the Ministries of Land and Water Conservation, and Fair Trading.

Railway overpass
Riverstone is one of the few suburbs left in the Sydney region with a level crossing with old-fashioned boom gates. On 28 February 2008, Aquilina made a private members statement, reaffirming the Labor Party's commitment to build a railbridge overpass at the current level crossing at Garfield Road East, Riverstone.

References

External links
 Maiden Speech in NSW Legisilative Assembly (p. 26)
 

1950 births
Living people
Ambassadors of Malta to China
Members of the New South Wales Legislative Assembly
Australian Labor Party members of the Parliament of New South Wales
Maltese emigrants to Australia
Speakers of the New South Wales Legislative Assembly
20th-century Australian politicians
21st-century Australian politicians
Shire Presidents and Mayors of Blacktown
Members of the Order of Australia
Recipients of the National Order of Merit (Malta)